Mikayla Victoria Simpson (born February 16, 2000), better known as Koffee, is a Jamaican Pop singer, songwriter, rapper, and guitarist from Spanish Town, Jamaica. She released her debut single "Burning" in 2017, and after releasing another single the following year, she signed with Columbia Records. Her 2019 debut EP Rapture -- a five-track release in which only two Reggae tracks were included -- won the Grammy Award for Best Reggae Album at the 62nd Annual Grammy Awards, making Koffee the youngest person and only woman to be awarded in the Best Reggae Album category. Her most recent album, "Gifted was released on March 25, 2022.

Early life and career 
Koffee's mother was an occasional actress, Seventh-day Adventist, and a Ministry of Health employee. Koffee's first musical inspirations stemmed from her mother's religious background. She sang in her church choir, taught herself guitar at the age of 12 on an instrument borrowed from a friend, and began writing lyrics inspired by listening to reggae singer Protoje.  She attended Ardenne High School in Kingston, Jamaica.

2010s

In 2016, she won her school talent show at Ardenne High School located in Kingston, Jamaica without realizing that the informal show at which she performed in her school cafeteria had been an audition. She went on to learn music theory and vocal technique in her high school choir. A defining moment for Koffee occurred in her final year of high school, when she performed at her school's talent show with other gifted artists in front of about 1,000 people. She indicated that the show gave her the first bit of confidence to perform and deliver music live.

Koffee gained popularity after uploading a video to Instagram of her singing. In 2017 she released her first single, "Legend", with just her voice and acoustic guitar. A tribute to Jamaican sprinter Usain Bolt, the song became a viral Instagram hit, once the athlete reposted it on his own Instagram. Awareness of the violence and social problems she witnessed growing up has influenced her lyrics, and besides Protoje and Chronixx she has cited Super Cat and Giggs among her musical inspirations.

Koffee was introduced by Cocoa Tea at the Rebel Salute, a reggae festival, and has also performed with her musical inspirations Protoje and Chronixx.

"Burning", her take on Upsetta Records' Ouji Riddim (which had been made popular by Jamaican artists Busy Signal and Luciano), followed. "Burning" grew out of her desire to inspire herself to push forward despite disappointment at not getting into post-secondary Sixth Form after she graduated from Ardenne High School. In June she spent three weeks at number one on The Foundation Radio Network's Top 30 Reggae Chart covering New York City and South Florida.

In 2018, Jamaican reggae/dancehall singer, songwriter, and deejay Cocoa Tea brought her on stage at the 2018 Rebel Salute and Rototom Sunsplash in Jamaica and Spain respectively. Protoje asked her to perform with him. Chronixx invited her to join him a BBC Radio 1Xtra broadcast from Tuff Gong Studios, and she went on to tour with him in the UK at venues such as Bush Hall and at Alexandra Palace. Koffee and Chronixx appeared on BBC Music Introducing...LIVE on November 10.

Koffee's December 2018 single "Raggamuffin" called out gun violence and governmental neglect of the youth. BBC Radio 1Xtra named Koffee one of its "Hot for 2019" artists. Her next single, "Toast", was produced by (izybeats) and (Walshy Fire) of Major Lazer. Both Chronixx and Protoje appear in the video. In 2019, Tory Lanez made a remix to "Toast" as a part of his International Fargo project which can be found on SoundCloud.

In 2018, she also signed with Columbia Records UK, and Rapture. Her debut EP on the label, was released on March 14, 2019. Her "Throne" video, which takes viewers on a tour through her home town of Spanish Town, Jamaica, debuted on The Fader on 22 January 2019. On 13 November 2019, Koffee was announced as an opening act for Harry Styles on select dates of the North American leg of his 2020 Love On Tour, and on 3 December as an opening act for the Latin American leg.

On 26 November 2019, Koffee released her first cross-over collaborative single "W", featuring hip-hop artist Gunna.

2020s
Rapture won a Grammy Award at the 62nd Annual Grammy Awards, making Koffee the youngest person (at 19 years old) and only woman to be awarded in the Best Reggae Album category.

Koffee was the musical guest on Nick Cannon's sketch comedy and improv television series Wild 'N Out which aired on February 18, 2020, on VH1.

In October 2020, Koffee was named by Elle magazine as one of "10 Trailblazing Women Changing The Future You Need To Know", the others being: Mowalola Ogunlesi, Tobi Kyeremateng, Ngozi Onwurah, Simi Lindgren, Balanda Atis, Magdalene Abraha, Holly Fischer, Celeste and Margaret Busby.

Her debut full-length album, Gifted, was released on 25 March 2022 to positive reviews.

Awards and nominations

Discography

Studio albums

EPs

Singles

As a lead artist

As a featured artist

Other guest appearances

References

2000 births
Living people
21st-century Jamaican women singers
Grammy Award winners
People from Spanish Town
Columbia Records artists